Goniacodon is an extinct genus from the Paleocene of North America.

Species

Goniacodon gaudryanus 
Goniacodon hiawathae
Goniacodon levisanus

References

External links
Goniacodon
Science

Mesonychids
Paleocene mammals of North America
Prehistoric placental genera
Fossil taxa described in 1892